Loy thompsoni is a species of sea slug, a shell-less marine gastropod mollusk in the family Corambidae.

Distribution 
This species is found along the west coast of North America from Alaska to California.

References

Chromodorididae
Gastropods described in 1991